Günther Haase (born 11 June 1925) is a German retired diver. Competing in the 10 m  platform he won a gold medal at the 1950 European Championships and a bronze at the 1952 Olympics. He was married to the national diving champion Paula Tatarek.

References

1925 births
Living people
German male divers
Olympic divers of Germany
Divers at the 1952 Summer Olympics
Olympic bronze medalists for Germany
Sportspeople from Hamburg
Olympic medalists in diving
Medalists at the 1952 Summer Olympics
20th-century German people